Shiwa Dam is an earthfill dam located in Aomori Prefecture in Japan. The dam is used for flood control. The catchment area of the dam is 22.9 km2. The dam impounds about 11  ha of land when full and can store 825 thousand cubic meters of water. The construction of the dam was started on 1950 and completed in 1961.

References

Dams in Aomori Prefecture
1961  establishments in Japan